Suriani Abdullah (born Eng Ming Ching; 23 January 1924 – 20 March 2013) was a former central committee member of the Communist Party of Malaya.

Background
Suriani was born in January 1924 in Sitiawan, Perak. She attended Nan Hwa High School, where she met other communists such as Tu Lung Shan and Chin Peng, and was politically radicalised. In 1940, Suriani joined the underground Communist Party of Malaya and was actively involved in mobilising and organising women workers in the Kinta Valley. She was elected a member of the Central Committee Member in 1975.

She is the author of Rejimen Ke-10 dan Kemerdekaan (The 10th Regiment and Independence), the official historical account of the 10th Regiment of the Malayan People's National Liberation Army, and Memoir Suriani Abdullah: Setengah Abad Perjuangan (The Memoirs of Suriani Abdullah: A Half-Century Struggle).

Later life and death
She resided in Chulaporn Village No. 12 in Sukhirin, Thailand with her husband, Abdullah CD, with their daughter and her family until her death in 2013.

References

1924 births
2013 deaths
Malaysian non-fiction writers
Malaysian women writers
Communist women writers
Malaysian communists
Converts to Islam
Malaysian Muslims
Malaysian people of Chinese descent
People from Sitiawan
People from Perak
20th-century Malaysian women writers
21st-century Malaysian women writers